Statistics of UAE Football League for the 1998–99 season.

Overview
It was contested by 12 teams, and Al-Wahda FC (Abu Dhabi) won the championship.

League standings

References
United Arab Emirates – List of final tables (RSSSF)

UAE Pro League seasons
United
1998–99 in Emirati football